The 2013 NCAA Division I women's soccer tournament (also known as the 2013 Women's College Cup) was the 32nd annual single-elimination tournament to determine the national champion of NCAA Division I women's collegiate soccer. The semifinals and championship game were played at WakeMed Soccer Park in Cary, North Carolina from December 6–8, 2013 while the preceding rounds were played at various sites across the country from November 15–30. 

UCLA defeated Florida State in the final, 1–0 (in overtime), to win their first national title. The Bruins (22–1–3) were coached by Amanda Cromwell.

The most outstanding offensive player was Jamia Fields from Florida State, and the most outstanding defensive player was Ally Courtnall from UCLA. Fields and Courtnall, alongside nine other players, were named to the All-Tournament team. 

The tournament's leading scorer, with 5 goals and 1 assist, was Makenzy Doniak from Virginia.

Qualification

All Division I women's soccer programs were eligible to qualify for the tournament. The tournament field remained fixed at 64 teams.

Format
Just as before, the final two rounds, deemed the Women's College Cup, were played at a pre-determined neutral site. All other rounds were played on campus sites at the home field of the higher-seeded team although with a few exceptions. The first round was played exclusively on the home fields of higher-seeded teams (noted with an asterisk below). However, the second and third rounds were played on the home fields of the home fields of the two remaining teams in each bracket with the highest seed (generally the #1 and #2 seed in each bracket with a few noted exceptions). Those teams are also noted with asterisk. Finally, the quarterfinal round, or the championship match for each bracket, was played on the home field of the higher-seeded team, with no exceptions.

National seeds

Teams

Bracket

Virginia Bracket

North Carolina Bracket

Virginia Tech Bracket

Florida State Bracket

College Cup

All-tournament team
Jamia Fields, Florida State (most outstanding offensive player)
Ally Courtnall, UCLA (most outstanding defensive player)
Sarah Killion, UCLA
Megan Oyster, UCLA
Katelyn Rowland, UCLA
Ashley Manning, Virginia Tech
Ashley Meier, Virginia Tech
Kristin Grubka, Florida State
Kelsey Wys, Florida State
Morgan Brian, Virginia
Makenzy Doniak, Virginia

See also 
 NCAA Women's Soccer Championships (Division II, Division III)
 NCAA Men's Soccer Championships (Division I, Division II, Division III)

References

NCAA
NCAA Women's Soccer Championship
NCAA Division I Women's Soccer Tournament
NCAA Division I Women's Soccer Tournament
NCAA Division I Women's Soccer Tournament